Limnebius is a genus of minute moss beetles in the family Hydraenidae. There are more than 160 described species in Limnebius.

See also
 List of Limnebius species

References

Further reading

External links

 

Staphylinoidea
Articles created by Qbugbot